Lucas Calodat (born 6 February 2002) is a French professional footballer who plays as a left-back for  club Saint-Étienne.

Career 
A youth product of Sarcelles, Paris FC, Entente SSG and Bastia, Calodat joined the youth academy of Saint-Étienne in 2017. He made his professional debut with Saint-Étienne in a 3–1 Ligue 1 loss to PSG on 28 November 2021, coming on as a sub in the 87th minute.

References

External links
 

2002 births
Living people
Footballers from Paris
French footballers
Association football fullbacks
Paris FC players
Entente SSG players
SC Bastia players
AS Saint-Étienne players
Ligue 1 players
Championnat National 2 players
Championnat National 3 players